New Asia Hotel is a 9-storey hotel and historic landmark in Hongkou, Shanghai. The hotel is situated at 422 Tiantong Road, opposite the Shanghai General Post Office Building. It was built in 1934 and was renovated in 2007.

References

Hotels in Shanghai
Hongkou District
Hotel buildings completed in 1934
1934 establishments in China